Tonantius Ferreolus (also called Tonance Ferréol in modern French) (between about 440 and 450–between 511 to after 517), was a vir clarissimus, or Gallo-Roman senator.

Life
Tonantius Ferreolus lived in Narbo (modern Narbonne). He was a witness when Sidonius Apollinaris, then bishop of Clermont, between 461 and 467, sent a letter to his friend, Donidius, describing a visit he made, a "most delightful time in the most beautiful country in the company of Tonantius Ferreolus (the elder) and Apollinaris, the most charming hosts in the world". Tonantius was on the estates of his father when Sidonius Apollinaris visited between 461 and 467. As Sidonius relates, "at Prusianum, as the other (estate) is called, (the young) Tonantius and his brothers turned out of their beds for us because we could not be always dragging our gear about: they are surely the elect among the nobles of our own age".

He is known to be a friend and relative of Sidonius Apollinaris. He was the son of Tonantius Ferreolus and Papianilla. Papianilla is generally regarded as belonging to the Arvernian family of the Aviti, though in a generation senior to Sidonius' wife of the same name.  The younger Tonantius' wife was Industria from Narbonne, born ca 450 to 460, married after 475, believed to have been daughter of Flavius Probus, Gallo-Roman Senator, and his wife Eulalia, cousin-german (first cousin) of Sidonius Apollinaris.  He was regarded as a senator even after the fall of the empire as was customary in Visigothic and Merovingian Gaul because his family had held the highest grades senatorial rank during the empire. No church offices are known for the younger Tonantius Ferreolus  and he held no known positions under the Visigothic kings in the period leading up to the Battle of Vouille unless he continued in his father's position of Rector Galliarum. He may also have been appointed Defensor Pedensis (Royal official in the city of Pedena, now in Croatia) by Ostrogothic King Theodoric in 511.  He had several siblings whose names are not preserved.  There is some argument as to whether Ferreolus of Narbo referred to as husband of Industria and father of Firminus is Tonantius Ferreolus or a brother. Narbo was within the realm of the Visigoths and Tonantius Ferreolus almost certainly remained loyal to Euric and Alaric II prior to the Battle of Vouille.  His involvement in that Battle is not known.  Following the collapse of the Kingdom of Alaric, Southern Gaul including Narbo was briefly under the control of the Ostrogothic Kingdom in Italy. However, subsequent to the fall of the Burgundian Kingdom in the early 530's, the Austrasian Franks under Theodoric quickly took control of Burgundy and Provence as far as the Mediterranean and along the coast from at least Uzes on the west to the Italian border on the east leaving Narbo, except for one or two brief incursions, in Visigothic hands. The familial control of the See of Uzes, within whose borders much of the property of the Ferreolan villa of Prusianum was included, began during the time of Tonantius Ferreolus.  Although Tonantius Ferreolus was not noted for any particular political or ecclesiastic initiative, his survival and that of his familia and properties following the loss  of Gaul, first by the Roman Empire, and then the Visigoths, was to have important repercussions for the durability of Gallo Roman political identity, autonomy, laws and customs during the Merovingian and subsequent eras.

What is known of Tonantius Ferreolus' descendants from that time is derived either from the history of the see of Uzes or from those few noblemen in the family such as Ferreolus, father of Ansbert and Agilulf, who apparently relocated out of the Visigothic Kingdom or were taken as hostages, (cf Gregory of Tours' relative Attalus ) to the heartland of the Austrasian Kingdom in the vicinity of Metz and Trier.  Since Ferreolus' grandfather, Tonantius Ferreolus the Elder was Prefect of Gaul (451) and possessed consular ancestors including the two Syagrii during the reign of Theodosius, Tonantius Ferreolus' Austrasia bound son Ferreolus would have possessed sufficient standing in the eyes of the Franks to marry a Frankish princess of a minor house.  At the time Ferreolus will have been relocating to Austrasia from Narbo, or more likely Frankish Provence, his second cousin Parthenius, Patrician  of Provence in 542 (Austrasian Governor - typically a Gallo-Roman.  The title was concurrent with the title of Rector of Provence) and Tax Collector at Trier by 548 was in a position to have interceded for him.

By his wife he had the following issue:

 Ferreolus, Senator of Narbonne, father of the Gallo-Roman senator Ansbertus. Settipani here cites Paul the Deacon in his work on the Bishops of Metz where Agilulf, Bishop of Metz, brother of Ansbert and uncle of Arnoald Bishop of Metz, was referred to as the "son of a senator".  Metz was in the Kingdom of Austrasia and Austrasia controlled Provence which included Uzes.  Although Tonantius Ferreolus who was attested at Narbo likely took the side of the Goths before the death of Alaric II, by the mid 6th century his family had clearly relocated to within Frankish territory which began west of Uzes and extended Eastward.  Nîmes, just to the south and a little west of Uzes was in Visigothic hands until the Arab capture in the 8th century.  Settipani, based on his reading of Paul the Deacon and the fact that the name Ferreolus was associated with the name Ansbert in two Autun Bishops in a Burgundian see that was regarded as both being hereditary and having ties with the Syagrii-Ferreoli, was persuaded apparently to accept the slightly confused 9th century account stating that the senator in question was a "Ferreolus."  Settipani suggests this Ferreolus tentatively as a son of Tonantius Ferreolus and Industria.  Settipani further suggests that this son married to a daughter of Frankish Ripuarian Royal house which had survived through the clemency of Theoderic of Austrasia who was thought to have been a son of Clovis' 1st wife, an unattested daughter of Sigebert, the penultimate Ripuarian Frankish king.  Kelley had come to the same or a similar conclusion in 1947  but it appears from those who cite him that the original idea was that Ansbertus was a son of Tonantius Ferreolus and not a grandson.
 Firminus, Bishop of Uzès in 507 (ca 490 – 538, 551 or October 11, 553); Feast Day October 11.

References

References and sources
 Sidonius Apollinaris, The Letters of Sidonius (Oxford: Clarendon, 1915), pp. clx-clxxxiii
 Christian Settipani, Les Ancêtres de Charlemagne (France: Éditions Christian, 1989).
 Christian Settipani, Continuite Gentilice et Continuite Familiale Dans Les Familles Senatoriales Romaines A L'epoque Imperiale, Mythe et Realite, Addenda I - III (juillet 2000- octobre 2002) (n.p.: Prosopographica et Genealogica, 2002).
 Ralph Whitney Mathisen, "The Ecclesiastical Aristocracy of Fifth Century Gaul: A Regional Analysis of Family Structure." Doctoral Dissertation, University of Wisconsin.  University Microfilms (1979).
 Christian Settipani, "L'apport de l'onomastique dans l'etude des genealogies carolingiennes" in ONOMASTIQUE ET PARENTE DANS L'OCCIDENT MEDIEVAL, Ed. K. S. B. Rohan & C. Settipani, Prosopographica et Genealogica (2000)
 T. Stanford Mommaerts & David H. Kelley, "The Anicii of Gaul and Rome." in Fifth-Century Gaul: A Crisis of Identity? edited by John Drinkwater and Hugh Elton. Cambridge, 1992.
 Gregory of Tours, The History of the Franks translated by Lewis Thorpe. Penguin. (1977) (free Latin edition)
 J. R. Martindale, The Prosopography of the Later Roman Empire, Volume II AD 395 - 527, Cambridge University Press, 1980.

5th-century births
6th-century deaths
5th-century Gallo-Roman people
Ancient Roman soldiers
Senators of the Roman Empire
Year of birth unknown
Year of death unknown